"The Power of Four" is a joint anthem composed for the British & Irish Lions rugby union team. It was written by Neil Myers in 2005. It was commissioned by the Lions head coach, Sir Clive Woodward for the 2005 British & Irish Lions tour to New Zealand as the official song. It was intended to be a universal anthem for the British & Irish Lions to be sung before every game. However it was criticised as being uninspiring as members of the Lions squad did not engage with it and it was also noted that the fans did not like it. It was dropped as the Lions anthem after the 2005 tour and led to changes in the way music would be chosen in future Lions tours.

Background 
The Lions were originally a representative team of the United Kingdom of Great Britain and Ireland, but players from the Irish Free State remained eligible after it left the U.K. in 1922. Donal Lenihan recalled his dissatisfaction that the U.K. anthem "God Save the Queen" was played during the 1989 tour to Australia. Later Lions teams lacked any anthem. There was similar discontent among Northern Ireland players about the use by the Ireland national team of "Amhrán na bhFiann", anthem of the Republic of Ireland. This led the Irish Rugby Football Union to commission "Ireland's Call" in 1995 as an alternative.

2005 Lions Tour 
The Power of Four was commissioned by Sir Clive Woodward for the 2005 British & Irish Lions tour to New Zealand and was written by Neil Myers. It was recorded by the Melody Music Lions Choir. The song is a classical composition played in a high key. It was first performed live by Welsh singer Katherine Jenkins before the British & Irish Lions rugby union match against Argentina at the Millennium Stadium in Cardiff, Wales in 2005. it was performed despite suggestions of either God Save the Queen, the Welsh national anthem Hen Wlad Fy Nhadau or a combination of the anthems of the Home Nations of England, Wales, Scotland and Ireland being played instead of The Power of Four. It is always sung in English.

Before the British & Irish Lions squad was selected, Woodward sent out bracelets with "The Power of Four" printed on them to potential British & Irish Lions players to try and create a sense of unity and to make them think about the upcoming tour to New Zealand. This was criticised as being "crazy". The Power of Four was also used as a motivational slogan in some of the Lions' team building activities.

The lyrics of The Power of Four were circulated to all of the members of the British & Irish Lions tour squad and the song was pre-added to the playlists on their tour iPods. The song was not released as a single however it was permitted to be broadcast by radio stations and it was made available to download on the Internet. The British & Irish Lions players were shown the words of The Power of Four on the Saturday before their first game and it was expected that they would know the words by the time they had arrived in New Zealand; however, it was mentioned by a British & Irish Lions spokesman that the players were under no obligation to sing it.

Reception
The BBC opined during the Lions' warm-up game against Otago that it was not inspiring for the Lions supporters to sing. Austin Healey observed that the players did not appear to like "The Power of Four" ("Power") when it was performed.

Before the first Test match, it was noticed that despite Lions fans being filmed singing "Power", none of the players did sing it when it was played as the Lions anthem before God Defend New Zealand. It was also noted that Lions fans felt that "Power"  was not catching on and some even suggested that Axel F would be better than "Power". It was also suggested that due to a perceived selection bias towards English members of the Lions, that Land of Hope and Glory should be used instead of "Power". The Lions' acting captain Martin Corry said that he did not attempt to sing "Power" because he felt that he would not be able to reach the correct notes. In 2009, Lions lock Alun Wyn Jones said that "I'd rather sing "The Power of Love" when asked if he would want to sing "The Power of Four".

The song experienced a mixed response in the media. In July 2005, following the Lions tour, a journalist on the BBC Sport website, James Standley, commented that "Power" is "hollow and disliked by fans." However, Lions coach Sir Clive Woodward said he hoped it would "stir the passions". It was also described in The Independent as an "excruciating mix of politburo and classical pop". However Danny Stevens in The New Zealand Herald said that "Power" was not a bad song but unfortunately nobody actually knew the tune or the words." The words of "Power" were also compared to be similar to the New Zealand Māori rugby union team's "Timatanga" haka in The Telegraph.

The anthem did not return for the 2009 British & Irish Lions tour to South Africa, which received a positive reaction from Sky Sports reporters.

Legacy 
The negative reception of The Power of Four was listed as one of the issues used to criticise Woodward for the failures of the tour. It was also pointed out that Woodward and team manager, Bill Beaumont used The Power of Four whenever they entered into a press conference which led to the press conferences being referred to as possibly being "mistaken for a revivalist meeting".

After 2005, The Power of Four became largely forgotten. During the 2013 British & Irish Lions tour to Australia, ESPN jokingly suggested that The Power of Four would be remixed into a hip hop song for the third test by Pharrell Williams and would be performed by Snoop Dogg.

See also
 British & Irish Lions

Notes

References

External links
MP3 file archived from the British & Irish Lions' site.  Note: here the lyrics are slightly different: "our countries' call" rather than "our lions' call".

British & Irish Lions
Sporting songs
Wikipedia Did you know articles that are good articles
2005 songs